The Confederate Last Stand Monument is a Confederate memorial in Little Rock, Arkansas, in the United States. The monument was dedicated October 15, 1929, and rededicated on September 14, 2013, after being relocated slightly to its current location due to roadbuilding.

See also

 List of Confederate monuments and memorials

References

1929 establishments in Arkansas
1929 sculptures
Buildings and structures in Little Rock, Arkansas
Confederate States of America monuments and memorials in Arkansas